Jock Hutcheson was a Scottish footballer who played in the 1870s and 1880s. Hutcheson played club football as a defender with Dumbarton where he was to spend the best part of ten seasons.

Honours
Dumbarton
 Scottish Cup: Winners 1882–83
Runners-up 1880–81, 1881–82, 1886–87
 Dumbartonshire Cup: Winners 1884–85
 Glasgow Charity Cup: Runners-Up 1881–82, 1884–85
 3 representative caps for Scotch Counties between 1882 and 1883
 4 representative caps for Dumbartonshire between 1885 and 1887.
 4 international trials for the Scotland international team between 1881 and 1884.

References

Scottish footballers
Dumbarton F.C. players
Year of birth missing
19th-century births
Year of death missing
Association football defenders